Mahasoa is a rural municipality in Madagascar. It belongs to the district of Ihosy, which is a part of Ihorombe Region. The population was 24877 inhabitants in 2018.

Primary and junior level secondary education are available in town. The majority 98% of the population of the commune are farmers.  The most important crop is rice, while other important products are peanuts, maize and cassava. Additionally fishing employs 2% of the population.

References

Populated places in Ihorombe